Alice Canepa (born 30 April 1978) is a retired tennis player from Italy.

Her highest singles and doubles rankings are No. 158 and No. 93, respectively.

Biography
In her career, Canepa won a total of 24 titles (19 in doubles) on the ITF Women's Circuit. She has reached the doubles final of the WTA Tier IV tournament in Palermo three times. Her biggest ITF title came when she won the doubles of the $50k event in Marseille in 2000. She has also competed on the Grand Slam tournaments on numerous occasions, but was unable to make it past round two in doubles and qualifying in singles.

Canepa retired after losing in the doubles final of the event in Palermo on 22 July 2007. She had partnered compatriot Karin Knapp, losing the final to Mariya Koryttseva and Darya Kustova, in straight sets.

WTA career finals

Doubles: 3 (runner-ups)

ITF finals

Singles: 13 (5–8)

Doubles: 33 (19–14)

References

External links
 
 

1978 births
Living people
Italian female tennis players
People from Savona
Grand Slam (tennis) champions in girls' doubles
French Open junior champions
Sportspeople from the Province of Savona